Edward Cameron (born December 25, 1987) is an American producer, singer, songwriter from San Francisco, California.

Career
Cameron received a full scholarship to the music conservatory at Chapman University in Orange, California in 2006. Due to a severe, undiagnosable illness, Cameron was forced out of college during his sophomore year. During a long stint in the hospital, he began experimenting with hip hop and pop production. Once recovered, Cameron began collaborating with bay area artists such as E-40, San Quinn, Keak da Sneek, Ya Boy, and Mistah F.A.B.
 
In 2010, Cameron relocated to Los Angeles and opened headquarters in Beverly Hills. Shortly after, he began collaborating with Tha Alumni Music Group's artist Kid Ink. They released "I Just Want It All" off Kid Ink's Daydreamer mixtape in late 2011, followed by Kid Ink’s single, "Time of Your Life" in 2012." Cameron also produced "Walk In The Club" and "Hell & Back" on Kid Ink's independent album Up & Away. He then joined Tha Alumni Music Group in February, 2012. 
 
After co-producing DJ Felli Fel's successful single "Reason To Hate" featuring Ne-Yo, Tyga, and Wiz Khalifa, Cameron produced "Money and the Power" and "Sunset" on Kid Ink’s major label debut, Almost Home.
 
Cameron is responsible for "More Than A King" from Kid Ink’s second studio album My Own Lane.

Production discography

Notes
"When I Sleep" was recorded for Tha Carter IV but didn't make the final cut.

References

Record producers from California
Singer-songwriters from California
American male singer-songwriters
Living people
1987 births
21st-century American male singers
21st-century American singers